The Green Island Nanliao Harbor is a passenger and fishing port in Green Island, Taitung County, Taiwan.

Destinations
The port serves destinations to Fugang Harbor in Taitung City and Kaiyun Harbor in Orchid Island.

References

Ports and harbors of Taitung County